Aniavan ( is a village in the Ani Municipality of the Shirak Province of Armenia. The Statistical Committee of Armenia reported its population was 516 in 2010, up from 377 at the 2001 census.

Demographics
The population of the village since 1926 is as follows:

References

Communities in Shirak Province
Populated places in Shirak Province